Silas A. Towne (June 14, 1875 – February 15, 1966) was a member of the Wisconsin State Assembly.

Biography
Towne was born in Greenwood, Vernon County, Wisconsin in 1875; reports have differed on the exact date. He would become a schoolteacher before purchasing a farm in La Valle (town), Wisconsin in 1898. Towne died in Reedsburg on February 15, 1966.

Political career
Towne was a member of the Assembly during the 1909 session. Other positions he held include town clerk of La Valle. He was a Democrat.

References

People from Vernon County, Wisconsin
People from Sauk County, Wisconsin
Democratic Party members of the Wisconsin State Assembly
City and town clerks
Schoolteachers from Wisconsin
Farmers from Wisconsin
1875 births
1966 deaths
Burials in Wisconsin